Bakes or Bakeš is a surname. Notable people with the name include:

 David Bakeš (born 1982), Czech snowboarder specializing in snowboard cross
 Milan Bakeš (born 1963), Czech sport shooter
 Martin Bakes (born 1937), English football left winger
 David "Bakes" Baker (born 1986), American poker player

See also
 Baking
 Backes, surname

Czech-language surnames